Henry Edward Pack (born 30 October 1912, date of death unknown) was an English athlete who competed in the 1938 British Empire Games. At the 1938 Empire Games he was a member of the English relay team which won the silver medal in the 4×440 yards event. In the 440 yards competition he was eliminated in the heats.

External links
Profile at TOPS in athletics

1912 births
Year of death missing
English male sprinters
Athletes (track and field) at the 1938 British Empire Games
Commonwealth Games silver medallists for England
Commonwealth Games medallists in athletics
Medallists at the 1938 British Empire Games